Sergnano is a comune (municipality) in the Province of Cremona in the Italian region of Lombardy, located about  east of Milan and about  northwest of Cremona.

Sergnano borders the following municipalities: Campagnola Cremasca, Capralba, Caravaggio, Casale Cremasco-Vidolasco, Castel Gabbiano, Mozzanica, Pianengo, Ricengo.

References

Cities and towns in Lombardy